Estudio 1 was a long-running Spanish TV drama series by Televisión Española since 1965 presenting many classic plays for the home audience. It was equivalent to :fr:Au théâtre ce soir (1966-1985) on TF1 and Play of the Month (1965-1983) on the BBC. The series was noted for its productions of the great Spanish Siglo de Oro playwrights as well as Shakespeare and Schiller.

It took its name from the studio it was filmed, Studio 1 at Prado del Rey.

References

RTVE shows
1965 television plays